Rovelstad is a surname. Notable people with the surname include:

Tommy Rovelstad (born 1972), Norwegian sledge hockey player
Trygve Rovelstad (1903–1990), American sculptor and medal designer

Norwegian-language surnames